The year 1635 in science and technology involved some significant events.

Botany
 Jardin des Plantes, Paris, planted as a physic garden by Guy de La Brosse.

Publication
 Guillaume de Baillou's Opera medica omnia, Paris.

Births
 May 9 – J. J. Becher, German physician and chemist (died 1682)
 July 18 – Robert Hooke, English scientist and inventor (died 1703)
 November 22 – Francis Willughby, English ornithologist and ichthyologist (died 1672)

Deaths
 September 16 – Metius, Dutch mathematician (born 1571)
 October 22 – Wilhelm Schickard, German professor of Hebrew and Astronomy (born 1592)
 John Mason, English explorer (born 1586)

References

 
17th century in science
1630s in science